Pamela Gorkin is an American mathematician specializing in complex analysis and operator theory. She is a professor of mathematics at Bucknell University.

Education and career
Gorkin earned bachelor's and master's degrees in statistics from Michigan State University in 1976. She then shifted to pure mathematics for her doctoral studies, completing her Ph.D. at Michigan State in 1982, the same year she joined the Bucknell Faculty. Her dissertation, Decompositions of the Maximal Ideal Space of L, was supervised by Sheldon Axler.

At Bucknell, she was Presidential Professor from 2001 to 2004.

Books
With Ulrich Daepp, Gorkin is the author of the undergraduate textbook Reading, Writing, and Proving: A Closer Look at Mathematics (Springer, 2003; 2nd ed., 2011).

With Daepp, Andrew Shaffer, and Karl Voss, she is the author of Finding Ellipses: What Blaschke Products, Poncelet’s Theorem, and the Numerical Range Know about Each Other (Carus Mathematical Monographs, MAA Press, 2018). The book studies a connection between Blaschke products, Poncelet's closure theorem, and the numerical range of matrices. A Blaschke product is a certain kind of mapping of the unit disk in the complex plane to itself, and the ones considered in the first part of the book have order three (they map the unit circle three-to-one to itself, so that each point on the unit circle has three preimages). These triples of preimages form triangles that are all inscribed in the unit circle, and (it turns out) they all circumscribe an ellipse. Thus, they form an infinite system of polygons inscribed in and circumscribing two conics, as Poncelet's theorem describes. The ellipse is the boundary of the numerical range of a certain matrix derived from the Blaschke product, a region within which the eigenvalues of the matrix can be found, and in this case the eigenvalues are at the foci of the ellipse. The book tells "a story of discovery" outlining these connections, extends similar results to Blaschke products of higher order, and outlines a plan for further research in this area.

Recognition
Gorkin was the 2018 AWM/MAA Falconer Lecturer. Her lecture was on "Finding Ellipses", the topic of one of her books. She is also the recipient of Bucknell's Lindback Award for Distinguished Teaching, and the Crawford Distinguished Teaching Award of the Mathematical Association of America.

References

Year of birth missing (living people)
Living people
20th-century American mathematicians
21st-century American mathematicians
American women mathematicians
Michigan State University alumni
Bucknell University faculty
20th-century women mathematicians
21st-century women mathematicians
20th-century American women
21st-century American women